Viktor Anatolyevich Karpukhin (born 27 February 1989) is a Russian former professional football player.

Club career
He made his Russian Football National League debut for FC Gazovik Orenburg on 4 April 2011 in a game against FC Chernomorets Novorossiysk.

External links
 

1989 births
People from Orenburg
Living people
Russian footballers
FC Gornyak Uchaly players
Association football forwards
FC Orenburg players
FC Nizhny Novgorod (2015) players
FC Nosta Novotroitsk players
FC Volga Ulyanovsk players
Sportspeople from Orenburg Oblast